Amândio da Costa Gonçalves (born 24 March 1943) is a former Portuguese professional footballer.

Career statistics

Club

Notes

References

External links

1943 births
Living people
Portuguese footballers
Portugal youth international footballers
Association football defenders
Primeira Liga players
Segunda Divisão players
S.L. Benfica footballers
F.C. Tirsense players
Associação Naval 1º de Maio players